Olympus Rupes is a group of cliffs along the northern face of Olympus Mons, the largest mountain on Mars and the largest volcano in the Solar System. It also forms the northern border of the mountain.

References

Cliffs on Mars
Amazonis quadrangle
Tharsis quadrangle